Doubanjiang (pinyin: dòubànjiàng,), also known as douban, toban-djan, broad bean chili sauce, or fermented chili bean paste, is a hot and savoury Chinese bean paste made from fermented broad beans, chili peppers, soybeans, salt and flour. Characteristically used in Sichuan cuisine, it has been called "the soul of Sichuan cuisine." Sichuan dishes such as mapo tofu, huoguo (Sichuan hotpot), the Yuxiang flavour profile, and Shuizhu all use doubanjiang as a key ingredient. Other regions have their own versions: in Guangdong and Taiwan, for instance, the Sichuan doubanjiang is called la-doubanjiang ("la" (辣) meaning 'hot' or 'spicy') to distinguish it from local non-spicy versions.

Main types

Pixian doubanjiang 
The most well-known variety of doubanjiang is arguably Pixian doubanjiang, named for Pixian (now Pidu District, Chengdu city), Sichuan. Pixian Doubanjiang is produced with a long fermentation period under sunlight (often longer than 3 years). The jingle for Pixian Doubanjiang used the ancient fermentation method, "flip it over during daytime, expose it at night, sunbathe it in sunny days, cover it when it rains.". 

The distinctive flavor of Pixian Doubanjiang from the place of origin, Pixian, has a close relationship with the geographical location. Pixian is located in the plains, with more sunshine, higher air humidity, and no water pollution. The environment provides an environment for the survival of microbial flora, which is needed for the fermentation process of Pixian Doubanjiang, and the unique microbial flora created a particular flavor of Pixian Doubanjiang.

Pixian doubanjiang has a reddish-brown color with a deep and complex umami profile. The standard way to use it is to first fry it in oil before adding other ingredients, infusing the oil with its colour and fragrance.

Production method 
Pixian doubanjiang is a geographical indication (GI) protected product, with its quality assessment standards last published in 2006, up to GB/T 20560-2006. It states:

 Ingredients 
 must include Erjingtiao chili, sourced from Pixian and the surrounding districts within east Sichuan.
 Broadbeans sourced from east Sichuan or the neighbouring Yunnan province, up to GB/T 10459 standards. 
 Water sourced from underground of Pixian, up to GB 5749 standards. 
 Procedure: 
 Soaking and de-shelling of selected broadbeans, the making of the Qu starter culture, and its fermentation into sweet broadbeans for more than 6 months. 
 Salting and crushing of the Erjingtiao chili and its fermentation. 
 Mixing of the broadbean culture with the Erjingtiao chilli culture in a particular ratio, and sundrying the mixture to allow for a further fermentation of 3 months. 
 Then the mature Pixian doubanjiang product is yielded. 
 Quality assessment: resultant products are graded to 3 classes. 
 Premium grade: red/brown in colour, coated in glistening oil, strong aroma of the chilli with rich savouriness, broadbean bits crisp and fragrant, disintegrate upon crushing, lasting aromatic aftertaste. 
 Grade I: light red/brown in colour, partially coated in glistening oil, chilli aroma and savrouriness moderately rich. 
 Grade II: red or light red/brown in colour, glistens but not coated in oil, broanbean bits lacking fragrance, no lasting aftertaste. 
 Quantitative analysis: total acids (in lactic acids) <= 2.0 g/100g. Salt (in NaCl) 15-22g/100g. 
The optimal process conditions for Doubanjiang are 56% water, 10% added salt, 40℃ fermentation temperature, and 40 hours of Qu starter-making time.

Others 
Doubanjiang may be produced at home with just soybeans, salt and spices. Normal home-made or factory-produced doubanjiang rarely has the long fermentation time that gives the Pixian version its character.

Hongyou doubanjiang (Chinese: 红油豆瓣, doubanjiang in red chili oil) is sometimes confused with Pixian doubanjiang. Hongyou doubanjiang is not fermented, it usually contains extra spices, and the chili oil can be made from any chili variety.

Binzhou (Binzhou, Shandong) watermelon doubanjiang is a non-spicy doubanjiang whose ingredients include soybeans, watermelon, flour, salt, etc. Binzhou watermelon Doubanjiang is often fermented, and processed without any chemical additives.

Doubanjiang used outside of Sichuan is often not spicy.

Storage method 
Doubanjiang is a fermented sauce. It is produced by microbial fermentation, and there is no guarantee that the microorganisms in it are completely inactivated when they are sold. Therefore, storing them at room temperature after opening is likely to accelerate the growth of microorganisms and make the condiments go bad. Doubanjiang is also high in fat. The fat in it may cause oxidation at room temperature. Condiments like doubanjiang should be kept well sealed in a glass container and refrigerated.

Dishes 
Doubanjiang can used for many dishes, Pixian Doubanjiang is known as the "soul of Sichuan cuisine" reputation. Doubanjiang can be used to make Mapo tofu, Twice-cooked pork, Sichuan hot pot, Yuxiang shredded pork, Kung Pao chicken, Stir-fried pork, Shuizhu pork (water boiled pork), etc.

See also

Fermented bean paste
Doenjang
List of fermented foods
List of fermented soy products
Douchi (Chinese fermented black beans)
Ssamjang
Gochujang
 Doubanjiang page (Chinese)

References

Chili paste
Chinese condiments
Fermented soy-based foods
Sichuan cuisine
Spicy foods